CAHA or Caha may refer to:

 Canadian Amateur Hockey Association, a former ice hockey governing body in Canada
 Calar Alto Observatory or Centro Astronómico Hispano-Alemán, an astronomy institute in Spain
 Caha Mountains, a mountain range in Ireland
 Robert Caha (born 1976), a Czech footballer

See also
 Caha-Paluma
 Caha v. United States, see Tax protester constitutional arguments